Madhusudana is an epithet of Vishnu and is the 73rd name in the Vishnu Sahasranama.

According to Adi Sankara's commentary on the Vishnu Sahasranama, Madhusudana means the "destroyer of Madhu".

Literature 

The death of Madhu and the origin of the epithet is described in the Padma Purana:

References
Cited from Sri Vishnu Sahasranama, commentary by Sri Sankaracharya, translated by Swami Tapasyananda, available at Sri Ramakrishna Math, Chennai;
available at an Indian web site and a US site.

Names of Vishnu
Vishnu
Hindu mythology
Vaishnavism